A cromlech  (sometimes also spelled "cromleh" or "cromlêh"; cf Welsh crom, "bent"; llech, "slate") is a megalithic construction made of large stone blocks. The word applies to two different megalithic forms in English, the first being an altar tomb (frequently called a "dolmen"), as William Borlase first denoted in 1769. A good example is at Carn Llechart. The second meaning of the name "cromlech" in English refers to large stone circles such as those found among the Carnac stones in Brittany, France.

Unlike in English, the word "cromlech" in many other languages (such as Azerbaijani,  Armenian, French, Greek, Indonesian, Italian, and Spanish) exclusively denotes a megalithic stone circle, whereas the word "dolmen" is used to refer to the type of megalithic altar tomb sometimes indicated by the English "cromlech". Also, more recently in English, scholars such as Aubrey Burl use "cromlech" as a synonym for "megalithic stone circle".

List 
 Dolni Glavanak Cromlech, an oval stone circle near Dolni Glavanak, Bulgaria
 Almendres Cromlech, the Cromlech of the Almendres megalithic complex, near Évora, Portugal
 Dinas Cromlech, a rock outcrop in the Llanberis Pass, Snowdonia, Wales

See also
 Crom Dubh

Notes

External links 

Megalithic monuments in Europe
Stone circles in the United Kingdom
Stone circles in Europe